Gerhardt Abrahams (born 9 August 1990) is a South African first class cricketer. He was included in the Griqualand West cricket team squad for the 2015 Africa T20 Cup.

References

External links
 

1990 births
Living people
South African cricketers
Border cricketers
Griqualand West cricketers
Northern Cape cricketers
Cricketers from Kimberley, Northern Cape
Wicket-keepers